"Happy"  is a song recorded by South Korean singer Taeyeon, released as a digital single originally on March 9, 2020 but postponed to May 4, 2020, by SM Entertainment. It is a pop song that reinterprets old school doo-wop and R&B with a modern sound, being described as a special gift for fans with lyrics about emotion and happiness found in the time spent with loved ones. The song was later included in the CD & LP version of Taeyeon's fourth EP What Do I Call You as bonus track.

Background 
On March 3, 2020, a teaser photo with the title of the single was revealed on Taeyeon's official website. Hours later it was revealed that the release of the single would take place on March 9 in celebration of her birthday.

The music video for "Happy" was released on May 4, 2020. Taeyeon later filmed a live summer performance of the song, which was released on June 26.

Release 
On March 9, 2020, the day of the song's planned release, the singer intended to commemorate it with a broadcast on V Live; however, SM Entertainment released an official statement saying that the song's release would be postponed until further notice and the subsequent broadcast cancelled due to Taeyeon's father's death on the same day. On April 27, 2020, SM Entertainment announced that the song would be released on May 4. On April 29, 2020, it was announced that the singer would be broadcasting live on V Live on the day of the song's release, as previously planned.

Commercial performance
Upon release, "Happy" topped all of South Korea's major realtime charts except Flo. It also topped iTunes Top Song Charts in 15 regions and rose to the top of the Korean music video chart of QQ Music.

It debuted at number 9 on the Billboard World Digital Songs chart with 1,000 downloads sold, becoming her 15th Top 10 entry on the chart. The song also debuted at number four on South Korea's Gaon Digital Chart for the chart issue dated May 3–9, 2020, becoming Taeyeon's 22nd top-ten entry in the country.

Track listing

Personnel 
Credits are adapted from Melon.

 Korean lyrics by Lee Seu Ran (Jam Factory) 
 Composed by Chris Wahle, Chelcee Grimes, Samuel Gerongco and Robert Gerongco
 Arranged by Chris Wahle
 Vocal directed by G-High
 Pro Tools operating by G-High
 Background vocals by Choi Youngkyung, Chelcee Grimes and Gabriela Geneva (NIIVA)
 Bass Performed by Taeyun Lee
 Digital Editing by Lee Min Kyu at SM Big Shot Studio / Kang Seonyoung at MonoTree Studio
 Engineered for Mix by Lee Min Kyu at SM Big Shot Studio
 Recorded by No Min Ji at SM Yellow Tail Studio / Kang Seonyoung at MonoTree Studio
 Mixed by Jung Eui Suk at SM Blue Cup Studio
 Mastered by Kwon Namwoo at 821 Sound Mastering

Charts

Weekly charts

Monthly charts

Year-end charts

Sales

Awards and nominations

Release history

References 

2020 songs
2020 singles
Taeyeon songs
South Korean contemporary R&B songs
Doo-wop songs
SM Entertainment singles
Korean-language songs
Songs written by Chelcee Grimes